Alice Sheets Marriott (October 19, 1907 – April 17, 2000)  was an American entrepreneur and philanthropist. She was married to J. Willard Marriott, founder of the hospitality company Marriott Corp.

Early life and career
Marriott was born in Salt Lake City, the daughter of Alice Taylor and Edwin Spencer Sheets. She graduated with honors from the University of Utah in 1927 at age 19. She was a member of Phi Kappa Phi Honor Society and Chi Omega sorority. She married J. Willard Marriott in the Salt Lake Temple on June 9, 1927.

In 1927, Alice worked as a bookkeeper with her husband at a root beer stand they both started. After introducing a Mexican-themed menu, the stand was renamed The Hot Shoppe and several more were opened. Alice and her husband opened their first motel, the Twin Bridges Motor Hotel in Arlington, Va., in 1957. This one motel grew into a chain of Marriott hotels.

Later life
Marriott served two ten-year terms on the board of the John F. Kennedy Center for the Performing Arts. She was also vice-chairman of the Republican National Committee from 1965 to 1976, and honorary chairman of the 1973 Richard Nixon inaugural committee.

Legacy
Marriott provided endowments to educational institutions. In 1988 she provided funds for the Marriott School of Management at Brigham Young University. The University of Utah opened the Alice Sheets Marriott Center for Dance, which houses the University's departments of Modern Dance and Ballet, on September 25, 1989.

Family
Marriott's mother Alice Taylor Sheets married U.S. Senator Reed Smoot on 2 July 1930 after both of them had been widowed.

References

1907 births
2000 deaths
Latter Day Saints from Utah
American hoteliers
Marriott International people
University of Utah alumni
American philanthropists
Brigham Young University people
Hotel founders
American women company founders
American women business executives
American business executives
Women hoteliers
Latter Day Saints from Washington, D.C.